is a Japanese actress, model and singer who started her career as a gravure idol in 2000. She has since become a leading actress in television and film.

Life and career

Early life and education 
Haruka Ayase was born as Aya Tademaru on March 24, 1985, in Hiroshima Prefecture. Her parents who survived the atomic bomb.

2000–2004: Early career 
She was invited by a friend to participate in the 25th Horipro Talent Scout Caravan; the reason why she was interested was that it was "an excuse to not attend club activities". She had nothing to show, so she did a rabbit imitation that was popular at school. She won the Special Jury Prize, thus making her debut in the entertainment world in 2000.

Her stage name was taken from the internet, with Ayase and herself choosing it from 16,000 applicants; on February 28, 2001, it was decided as "Haruka Ayase".

In addition to photo collections and weekly magazines, her popularity as a gravure idol increased with appearances on local programs such as Cosmo Angel. Her pictorial activities decreased as she began to receive attention as an actress.

Ayase made her acting debut in 2001 in part 3 of Kindaichi Shōnen no Jikenbo starring Jun Matsumoto. 

In 2003, she made her first regular appearance in a serial drama with Boku no Ikiru Michi. 

She was selected as a cast member of Socrates in Love in 2004; she won Best Supporting Actress at the 42nd Television Drama Academy Awards for her portrayal of Aki Hirose, a high schooler with leukemia. Ayase shaved her hair and changed her weight in order to match Masami Nagasawa's portrayal of the character in the film.

2005–2014: Singing debut, Yae's Sakura 
On March 24, 2006, Ayase made her debut as a singer with the single "Period", produced by Takeshi Kobayashi. The single debuted 8th on the Oricon charts.

In 2007, she starred in the television drama Hotaru no Hikari, an adaptation of the manga of the same name, with Naohito Fujiki. A sequel was broadcast in 2010, and the movie was released in 2012.

Ayase made her first appearance in an NHK taiga drama with Yae's Sakura, which focuses on Niijima Yae, a warrior, educator, scholar, and nurse of the late Edo period. In 2014, the series was nominated for the International Emmy Award for Best Drama Series.

2015–present: Our Little Sister 
In 2015, Ayase starred in Our Little Sister alongside Masami Nagasawa, Kaho, and Suzu Hirose. The film premiered at the 2015 Cannes Film Festival. It was subsequently released in Japan on June 13, 2015 and premiered in London, England, on October 14, 2015 as part of the BFI London Film Festival.

In 2016, Ayase starred as Balsa, a spear wielder and bodyguard, in Guardian of the Spirit, an NHK taiga drama. The role involved stage combat. She starred in all three seasons of the drama. 

In 2022, she made her "month 9" debut, starring in My Ex-Boyfriend's Last Will. This was her first Fuji TV serial drama since Shitaotokoa Wo Niyoshi around 14 years prior.

Other ventures 
The Japan Times called Ayase "the Japanese version of Anne Hathaway".

Endorsements 
Ayase is a sought-after endorser of products in Japan, appearing in commercials for major consumer brands such as Coca-Cola, SK-II, and KFC.

Personal life 
She was once detained in New Zealand after being mistaken for a spy.

The scheme defaulted on repayments to Ayase's company in May 2021, and the accountant's son arranged for a full refund of the investment. The accountant and three others were arrested for investment law violations in November 2022. Other investors alleged that the accountant used his relationship with Ayase to solicit investments in the scheme.

Philanthropy
In March 2011, she launched the awareness for raising about the Tohoku earthquake and tsunami and the subsequent Fukushima nuclear disaster and invited Japanese and international celebrities to add their videos for triple tragedy in Japan. Despite Fukushima crisis, she made a call to action to support the victims of triple disaster and to raise funds in the relief effort. In conjunction, she has also created her own website for the cause.

Health
While filming for Cyborg She, Ayase broke her nose.

On August 31, 2021, Ayase announced on Twitter and Instagram that she had contracted COVID-19 Delta variant. Though she was originally recovering at home, she was hospitalized after symptoms of pneumonia.

Filmography

Television

Film

Japanese voiceovers

Television documentary
Haruka Ayase Listen to War Experience (TBS, 2010–2019)

Others
47th Japan Record Awards (TBS, 2005), host
Kōhaku Uta Gassen (NHK)
63rd (2012), judge
64th (2013), red team captain
66th (2015), red team captain
70th (2019), red team captain

Discography

Singles

Awards and nominations

Television Drama Academy Awards

References

External links

 Talent Agency official website 
 Victor Entertainment official website 
 
 

1985 births
Living people
Actors from Hiroshima
Japanese women pop singers
Japanese idols
Musicians from Hiroshima
Taiga drama lead actors
21st-century Japanese singers
21st-century Japanese actresses
Horipro artists
21st-century Japanese women singers
Horikoshi High School alumni